Michal James Menet (born August 8, 1997) is an American football center for the Seattle Sea Dragons of the XFL. He played college football at Penn State and was selected by the Cardinals in the seventh round of the 2021 NFL Draft.

Early life and background
Menet was born on August 8, 1997, at the Reading Hospital to Sherry Graffius, a dental hygienist, and Brian Menet, an integrated warehouse logistics manager. Menet predominantly grew up in Birdsboro, Pennsylvania, with his father and step-mother, Pamela Shupp Menet, Berks County Economic Director who played a large role in the development process of M. Night Shyamalan’s Avatar at the Reading Pagoda.

High school career
Menet played high school football at Exeter Township Senior High School in Reading, Pennsylvania. In 2015, Menet blocked a punt in a game against Governor Mifflin Senior High School which led the Exeter Eagles to their first league championship in over a decade.

Predominantly an offensive and defensive lineman throughout high school, Menet also played tight end his senior year due to a quarterback’s injury.

Menet was coached by Matt Bauer and Kerry Ciatto in high school. In his junior and senior years, Menet was coached by his older brother, Christian, who played college football for the Eastern Michigan Eagles.

College career
Menet was ranked as a fourstar recruit by 247Sports.com coming out of high school. He committed to Penn State on May 29, 2015.

Professional career

Arizona Cardinals
Menet was drafted by the Arizona Cardinals in the seventh round (247th overall) of the 2021 NFL Draft on May 1, 2021. Menet officially signed with the Cardinals on May 20, 2021, with the contract details initially being undisclosed. He was waived on August 30, 2021 and re-signed to the practice squad. He was released on September 7. He re-signed with their practice squad on September 29. Menet was released on October 5.

Green Bay Packers
On December 15, 2021, Menet was signed to the Green Bay Packers practice squad. 

On January 25, 2022, he signed a reserve/future contract with the Packers. He was waived on August 30. On December 13, 2022, Menet was signed to the practice squad.

Personal life
Menet has a younger brother, Joey Schlaffer, who committed to play football at Penn State in October 2021. Schlaffer helped lead Exeter to its first ever PIAA District III Championship in November 2021.

References

External links
Penn State Nittany Lions bio

1997 births
Living people
American football centers
Arizona Cardinals players
Green Bay Packers players
Penn State Nittany Lions football players
People from Birdsboro, Pennsylvania
Players of American football from Pennsylvania
Seattle Sea Dragons players
Sportspeople from the Delaware Valley